Lincoln Township is one of twelve townships in Emmet County, Iowa, USA.  As of the 2000 census, its population was 220.

History
Lincoln Township was created in 1887. It was named for Abraham Lincoln, sixteenth President of the United States.

Geography
According to the United States Census Bureau, Lincoln Township covers an area of 28.6 square miles (74.08 square kilometers); of this, 27.14 square miles (70.29 square kilometers, 94.88 percent) is land and 1.46 square miles (3.79 square kilometers, 5.12 percent) is water.

Cities, towns, villages
 Dolliver

Adjacent townships
 Iowa Lake Township (east)
 Armstrong Grove Township (southeast)
 Swan Lake Township (south)
 Center Township (southwest)
 Ellsworth Township (west)

Cemeteries
The township contains these two cemeteries: Lincoln Township and Palestine.

Rivers
 Des Moines River (east fork)

Lakes
 Okampanpeedan Lake (also known as Tuttle Lake)

Landmarks
 Okamanpeedan State Park
 Tuttle Lake County Park

School districts
 Armstrong-Ringsted Community School District
 Estherville Lincoln Central Community School District

Political districts
 Iowa's 4th congressional district
 State House District 7
 State Senate District 4

References
 United States Census Bureau 2008 TIGER/Line Shapefiles
 United States Board on Geographic Names (GNIS)
 United States National Atlas

External links
 US-Counties.com
 City-Data.com

Townships in Emmet County, Iowa
Townships in Iowa